Concord is an unincorporated community in Pemiscot County, in the U.S. state of Missouri.

History
The community once contained a church and a school, which both are now defunct. The area derives its name from the Concord Baptist Church, founded in 1898.

References

Unincorporated communities in Pemiscot County, Missouri
Unincorporated communities in Missouri